Bronisław Bebel (born 16 May 1949) is a Polish former volleyball player, a member of the Polish national team in 1968–1978, and 1976 Olympic Champion.

Personal life
He was born in Noyelles-sous-Lens, France. On 11 September 1971, he married Jolanta Rzymowska.

Honours

Clubs
 CEV European Champions Cup 
  1972/1973 – with Resovia
 National championships
 1970/1971  Polish Championship, with Resovia
 1971/1972  Polish Championship, with Resovia
 1973/1974  Polish Championship, with Resovia
 1974/1975  Polish Cup, with Resovia
 1974/1975  Polish Championship, with Resovia

External links
 
 
 Player profile at Volleybox.net

1949 births
Living people
Sportspeople from Pas-de-Calais
Polish men's volleyball players
Olympic volleyball players of Poland
Volleyball players at the 1972 Summer Olympics
Volleyball players at the 1976 Summer Olympics
Olympic gold medalists for Poland
Olympic medalists in volleyball
Medalists at the 1976 Summer Olympics
Resovia (volleyball) players